"Mama Knows the Highway" is a song written by Pete Wasner and Charles John Quarto, and recorded by American country music artist Hal Ketchum. It was released in June 1993 as the third single from his album Sure Love. The song reached number 8 on the Billboard Hot Country Singles & Tracks chart in August 1993.

Music video
The music video was directed by Dick Buckley and premiered in mid-1993.

Chart performance

References

1993 singles
Hal Ketchum songs
Song recordings produced by Allen Reynolds
Curb Records singles
1992 songs
Songs written by Pete Wasner
Songs about truck driving